Guran is a comic strip character.

Guran may also refer to:

Guran, Haute-Garonne, a town in France
Guran, Alborz, a village in Alborz Province, Iran
Guran, East Azerbaijan, a village in East Azerbaijan Province, Iran
Guran, Hormozgan, a village in Hormozgan Province, Iran
Guran, Baft, a village in Kerman Province, Iran
Guran, Zarand, a village in Kerman Province, Iran
Guran-e Gowra, a village in Kermanshah Province, Iran
Guran, Lorestan, a village in Lorestan Province, Iran
Guran, Zanjan, a village in Zanjan Province, Iran
Guran (Kurdish name), a Kurdish name
Guran (Kurdish tribe), a Kurdish tribe of Western Iran

See also
Goran (disambiguation)